Porto or Oporto is the second-largest city in Portugal, the capital of the Oporto District, and one of the Iberian Peninsula's major urban areas. Oporto city proper, which is the entire municipality of Porto, is small compared to its metropolitan area, with an estimated population of just 231,800 people in a municipality with only 41.42 km2. It is recognized as a global city with a Gamma + rating from the Globalization and World Cities Research Network.

Located along the Douro River estuary in northern Portugal, Oporto is one of the oldest European centres, and its core was proclaimed a World Heritage Site by UNESCO in 1996, as "Historic Centre of Porto, Luiz I Bridge and Monastery of Serra do Pilar". The historic area is also a National Monument of Portugal. The western part of its urban area extends to the coastline of the Atlantic Ocean. Its settlement dates back many centuries, when it was an outpost of the Roman Empire. Its combined Celtic-Latin name, Portus Cale, has been referred to as the origin of the name Portugal, based on transliteration and oral evolution from Latin. In Portuguese, the name of the city includes a definite article: o Porto ("the port" or "the harbor"), which is where its English name "Oporto" comes from.

Port wine, one of Portugal's most famous exports, is named after Porto, since the metropolitan area, and in particular the cellars of Vila Nova de Gaia, were responsible for the packaging, transport, and export of fortified wine. In 2014 and 2017, Oporto was elected The Best European Destination by the Best European Destinations Agency. Oporto is on the Portuguese Way path of the Camino de Santiago.

History

Early history
Proto-Celtic and Celtic people were among the first known inhabitants of the area. Ruins of that period have been discovered in several areas. Archaeological findings reveal that there were also human settlements at the mouth of the Douro River as early as 8th century BC, which hints to a Phoenician trading settlement there.  

During the Roman occupation of the Iberian Peninsula, the city developed as an important commercial port, primarily in the trade between Olissipona (the modern Lisbon) and Bracara Augusta (the modern Braga). Oporto was also important during the Suebian and Visigothic times, and a centre for the expansion of Christianity during that period.

Porto fell under the control of the Moors during the invasion of the Iberian Peninsula in 711. In 868, Vímara Peres, an Asturian count from Gallaecia, and a vassal of the King of Asturias, Léon and Galicia, Alfonso III, was sent to reconquer and secure the lands back into Christian hands. This included the area from the Minho to the Douro River: the settlement of Portus Cale and the area that is known as Vila Nova de Gaia. Portus Cale, later referred to as Portucale, was the origin for the modern name of Portugal.

In 1387, Oporto was the site of the marriage of John I of Portugal and Philippa of Lancaster, daughter of John of Gaunt; this symbolized a long-standing military alliance between Portugal and England. The Portuguese-English alliance (see the Treaty of Windsor) is the world's oldest recorded military alliance. 

In the 14th and 15th centuries, Porto's shipyards contributed to the development of Portuguese shipbuilding. Also from the port of Porto, in 1415, Prince Henry the Navigator (son of John I of Portugal) embarked on the conquest of the Moorish port of Ceuta, in northern Morocco. This expedition by the king and his fleet, which included Prince Henry, was followed by navigation and exploration along the western coast of Africa, initiating the Portuguese Age of Discovery. The nickname given to the people of Oporto began in those days; Portuenses are to this day, colloquially, referred to as tripeiros (tripe peoples), referring to this period of history, when higher-quality cuts of meat were shipped from Oporto with their sailors, while off-cuts and by-products, such as tripe, were left behind for the citizens of Porto; tripe remains a culturally important dish in modern-day Porto.

18th century
By the 13th century, the wine produced in the Douro valley was already transported to Oporto in barcos rabelos (flat sailing vessels). In 1703, the Methuen Treaty established the trade relations between Portugal and England. In 1717, the first English trading post was established in Porto. The production of port wine then gradually passed into the hands of a few English firms. To counter this dominance, Prime Minister Marquis of Pombal established a Portuguese firm receiving the monopoly of the wines from the Douro valley. He demarcated the region for the production of port, to ensure the wine's quality; this was the first attempt to control wine quality and production in Europe. The small winegrowers revolted against his strict policies on Shrove Tuesday, burning down the buildings of this firm. The revolt was called Revolta dos Borrachos (revolt of the drunkards).

Between 1732 and 1763, Italian architect Nicolau Nasoni designed a baroque church with a tower that became its architectural and visual icon: the Torre dos Clérigos (English: Clerics' Tower).
During the 18th and 19th centuries, the city became an important industrial centre and its size and population increased.

19th century
The invasion of the Napoleonic troops in Portugal under Marshal Soult brought war to the city of Porto. On 29 March 1809, as the population fled from the advancing French troops and tried to cross the river Douro over the Ponte das Barcas (a pontoon bridge), the bridge collapsed under the weight. This event is still remembered by a plate at the Ponte D. Luis I. The French Army was rooted out of Oporto by Arthur Wellesley, 1st Duke of Wellington, when his Anglo-Portuguese Army crossed the Douro River from the Mosteiro da Serra do Pilar (a former convent) in a brilliant daylight coup de main, using wine barges to transport the troops, outflanking the French Army.

On 24 August 1820, a liberal revolution occurred, quickly spreading without resistance to the rest of the country. It began with a military insurrection in the city of Porto. In 1822, a liberal constitution was accepted, partly through the efforts of the liberal assembly of Oporto (Junta do Porto). When Miguel I of Portugal took the Portuguese throne in 1828, he rejected this constitution and reigned as an antiliberal, absolutist monarch. A Civil War was then fought from 1828 to 1834 between those supporting Constitutionalism, and those opposed to this change, keen on near-absolutism and led by D. Miguel. Oporto rebelled again and had to undergo a siege of eighteen months between 1832 and 1833 by the absolutist army. Oporto is also called "Cidade Invicta" (English: Unvanquished City) after successfully resisting the Miguelist siege. After the abdication of King Miguel, the liberal constitution was re-established.

Known as the city of bridges, Oporto built its first permanent bridge, the Ponte das Barcas (a pontoon bridge), in 1806. Three years later, it collapsed under the weight of thousands of fugitives from the French invasions during the Peninsular War, causing thousands of deaths. It was replaced by the Ponte D. Maria II, popularised under the name Ponte Pênsil (suspended bridge) and built between 1841 and 1843; only its supporting pylons have remained. The Ponte D. Maria, a railway bridge, was inaugurated on 4 November of 1877; it was considered a feat of wrought iron engineering and was designed by Gustave Eiffel, notable for his Parisian tower. The later Ponte Dom Luís I replaced the aforementioned Ponte Pênsil. This last bridge was made by Teophile Seyrig, a former partner of Eiffel. Seyrig won a governmental competition that took place in 1879. Building began in 1881 and the bridge was opened to the public on 31 October 1886.

A higher-learning institution in nautical sciences (Aula de Náutica, 1762) and a stock exchange (Bolsa do Porto, 1834 – 1910) were established in the city, but were discontinued later.

Unrest by Republicans led to the first revolt against the monarchy in Oporto on 31 January 1891. This resulted ultimately in the overthrow of the monarchy and proclamation of the republic by the 5 October 1910 revolution.

20th century
On 19 January 1919, forces favourable to the restoration of the monarchy launched a counter-revolution in Oporto known as Monarchy of the North. During this time, Oporto was the capital of the restored kingdom, as the movement was contained to the north. The monarchy was deposed less than a month later and no other monarchist revolution in Portugal happened again.

The historic centre of Oporto was declared a World Heritage Site by UNESCO in 1996. The World Heritage Site is defined in two concentric zones; the "Protected area", and within it the "Classified area". The Classified area comprises the medieval borough located inside the 14th-century Romanesque wall.

Geography

In 1996, UNESCO recognised Porto's historic centre as a World Heritage Site. Among the architectural highlights of the city, Oporto Cathedral is the oldest surviving structure, together with the small romanesque Church of Cedofeita, the gothic Igreja de São Francisco (Church of Saint Francis), the remnants of the city walls and a few 15th-century houses. The baroque style is well represented in the city in the elaborate gilt work interior decoration of the churches of St. Francis (São Francisco) and St. Claire (Santa Clara), the churches of Mercy (Misericórdia) and of the Clerics (Clérigos), the Episcopal Palace of Porto, and others. The neoclassicism and romanticism of the 19th and 20th centuries also added interesting monuments to the landscape of the city, like the magnificent Stock Exchange Palace (Palácio da Bolsa), the Hospital of Saint Anthony, the Municipality, the buildings in the Liberdade Square and the Avenida dos Aliados, the tile-adorned São Bento railway station and the gardens of the Crystal Palace (Palácio de Cristal). A guided visit to the Palácio da Bolsa, and in particular, the Arab Room is a major tourist attraction.

Many of the city's oldest houses are at risk of collapsing. The population in Oporto municipality dropped by nearly 100,000 since the 1980s, but the number of permanent residents in the outskirts and satellite towns has grown strongly.

Administratively, the municipality is divided into 7 civil parishes (freguesias):
Aldoar, Foz do Douro e Nevogilde
Bonfim
Campanhã
Cedofeita, Santo Ildefonso, Sé, Miragaia, São Nicolau e Vitória
Lordelo do Ouro e Massarelos
Paranhos
Ramalde

Climate

Porto features a warm-summer Mediterranean climate (Köppen: Csb), with influences of an oceanic climate (Cfb), like northern Spain. As a result, its climate shares many characteristics with the warm, dry Mediterranean climates of southern Europe and the wet marine west coast climates of the North Atlantic, providing it warm, dry summers and mild, rainy winters. Cool and rainy days can, occasionally, interrupt the dry season. The annual precipitation is high and concentrated in the winter months, making Oporto one of the wettest major cities of Europe. However, long periods with warmer temperatures and sunny days are frequent even during the rainiest months.

During such heatwaves, the humidity remains quite low. Nearby beaches are often windy and usually cooler than the urban areas. Summer average temperatures are a few degrees cooler than those expected in more continentally Mediterranean-influenced Portuguese cities because of the oceanic influence.

The weather is often rainy for long stretches, although prolonged sunny periods do occur.

Politics and government

Local election results 1976–2021

Active political parties established in Porto
The Portuguese party Iniciativa Liberal (IL), founded and headquartered in Porto, is the only Portuguese party represented in parliament which is headquartered out of Lisbon area.

Demographics 

Breaking down the population further shows that there is a higher percentage of women than men. Estimates from 2016 show that the population is 55% female, compared to 45% male. The largest age group, according to 2016 estimates, is 60 to 69, followed by residents in the 50 to 59 demographic. The majority 93.7% of residents were born in Portugal. 

The city also has residents that originally were born in Angola, Brazil, Cape Verde, and countries across Europe. Oporto has seen its population climb over the years and with a thriving economy and a growing tourism industry, the population is only expected to continue to increase in the upcoming years.

Census results

Economy

Porto plus the conurbation to which it belongs and has Oporto municipality as its central core forming the nucleus of the conurbation, is a major industrial and financial center of both Portugal and the Iberian Peninsula. As the most important city in the heavily industrialized northwest, many of the largest Portuguese corporations from diverse economic sectors, like Altri, Ambar, Amorim, Bial, BPI, Cerealis, CIN, Cofina, EFACEC, Frulact, Lactogal, Millennium bcp, Oporto Editora, RAR, Sonae, Sonae Indústria, and Super Bock Group, are headquartered in the Greater Metropolitan Area of Porto, most notably, in the core municipalities of Maia, Matosinhos, Porto, and Vila Nova de Gaia.

The city's former stock exchange (Bolsa do Porto) was transformed into the largest derivatives exchange of Portugal, and merged with Lisbon Stock Exchange to create the Bolsa de Valores de Lisboa e Porto, which eventually merged with Euronext, together with Amsterdam, Brussels and Paris stock and futures exchanges. The building formerly hosting the stock exchange is currently one of the city's touristic attractions, with the Salão Árabe (Arab Room in English) being its major highlight. The Banco Português de Fomento (BPF), a Portuguese state-owned development bank established in 2020, is headquartered in Porto.

Porto hosts a popular Portuguese newspaper, Jornal de Notícias. The building where its offices are located (which has the same name as the newspaper) was at a time one of the tallest in the city (it has been superseded by a number of modern buildings which have been built since the 1990s).

Porto Editora, one of the biggest Portuguese publishers, is also located in Porto. Its dictionaries are among the most popular references used in the country, and the translations are very popular as well.

The economic relations between the city of Oporto and the Upper Douro River have been documented since the Middle Ages. However, they were greatly deepened in the modern ages.  Indeed, sumach, dry fruits and nuts and the Douro olive oils sustained prosperous exchanges between the region and Porto. From the riverside quays at the river mouth, these products were exported to other markets of the Old and New World. However, the greatest lever to interregional trade relations resulted from the commercial dynamics of the Port wine (Vinho do Porto) agro-industry.  It decidedly bolstered the complementary relationship between the large coastal urban centre, endowed with open doors to the sea, and a region with significant agricultural potential, especially in terms of the production of extremely high quality fortified wines, known by the world-famous label Port. The development of Oporto was also closely connected with the left margin of River Douro in Vila Nova de Gaia, where is located the amphitheatre-shaped slope with the Port wine cellars.

The city is very much the gateway to Portugal's northern region as well as the northern and western areas of Spain. Within a two-hour drive of Porto's airport there are four Unesco World Heritage sites and popular Spanish tourist hotspots such as Santiago de Compostela.
In a study concerning competitiveness of the 18 Portuguese district capitals, Oporto was the worst-ranked. The study was made by Minho University economics researchers and was published in Público newspaper on 30 September 2006. The best-ranked cities in the study were Évora, Lisbon and Coimbra. Nevertheless, the validity of this study was questioned by some Oporto notable figures (such as local politicians and businesspersons) who argued that the city proper does not function independently but in conurbation with other municipalities. A 2007 ranking published in Expresso ranked Oporto as the third best city to live in Portugal – tied with Évora and below Guimarães and Lisbon. 

The Oporto metropolitan area had a GDP amounting to $43.0 billion, and $21,674 per capita.

Tourism

Over the last few years, Oporto has experienced significant tourism increases, which may be partly linked to the Ryanair hub at Francisco de Sá Carneiro Airport. Oporto won the European Best Destination 2012, 2014 and 2017 awards.

The city received 2.8 million overnight visitors and 1.4 million day trippers between January and November 2017, with 73% from other countries. Tourism revenue has been increasing by over 11%, according to a 2018 report.

According to a February 2019 report, over 10% of economic activity in Oporto is generated by tourism. The hotel occupancy rate in 2017 was 77%. A scholarly study published in June 2019 stated that "Porto is one of the fastest-growing European tourist destinations that has experienced
exponential growth in the demand for city-break tourists".

Transport

Roads and bridges

The road system capacity is augmented by the Via de Cintura Interna or A20, an internal highway connected to several motorways and city exits, complementing the Circunvalação 4-lane peripheric road, which borders the north of the city and connects the eastern side of the city to the Atlantic shore. The city is connected to Valença (Viana do Castelo) by highway A28, to Estarreja (Aveiro) by the A29, to Lisbon by the A1, to Bragança by the A4 and to Braga by the A3. There is also an outer-ring road, the A41, that connects all the main cities around Porto, linking the city to other major metropolitan highways such as the A7, A11, A42, A43 and A44. Since 2011, a new highway, the A32, connects the metropolitan area to São João da Madeira and Oliveira de Azeméis.

The Dom Luís I Bridge (Ponte de Dom Luís I) is a double-deck metal arch bridge that spans the River Douro between Oporto and Vila Nova de Gaia. Built in 1886, its 172 metres (564 ft) span was then the longest of its type in the world. The top-level is used for the Oporto Metro trains, with an option for pedestrians; the lower level carries traffic and pedestrians.

During the 20th century, major bridges were built: Arrábida Bridge, which at its opening had the biggest concrete supporting arch in the world, and connects the north and south shores of the Douro on the west side of the city, S. João, to replace D. Maria Pia and Freixo, a highway bridge on the east side of the city. The newest bridge is Infante Dom Henrique Bridge, finished in 2003. Two more bridges are said to be under designing stages and due to be built in the next 10 years, one on the Campo Alegre area, nearby the Faculty of Humanities and the Arts, and another one in the area known as the Massarelos valley. 

Porto is often referred to as Cidade das Pontes (City of the Bridges), besides its more traditional nicknames of "Cidade Invicta" (Unconquered/ Invincible City) and "Capital do Norte" (Capital of the North).

Cruising 
In July 2015 a new cruise terminal was opened at the port of Leixões, which is north of the city in Matosinhos.

Airports

The airport underwent a massive programme of refurbishment due to the Euro 2004 football championships being partly hosted in the city. It is connected to central Oporto by metro’s line E.

Public transport

Railways

Porto's main railway station is Campanhã railway station, located in the eastern part of the city and connected to the lines of Douro (Peso da Régua/Tua/Pocinho), Minho (Barcelos/Viana do Castelo/Valença) and centre of Portugal (on the main line to Aveiro, Coimbra and Lisbon).

From Campanhã station, both light rail and suburban rail services connect to the city center. The main central station is São Bento Station, which is itself a notable landmark in the heart of Porto. This station was built between 1900 and 1916, based on plans by architect José Marques da Silva. The large panels of azulejo tile were designed by Jorge Colaço; the murals represent moments in the country's history and rural scenes showing the people of various regions.

Porto is connected with Lisbon via high-speed trains, Alfa Pendular, that cover the distance in 2h 42min. The intercities take slightly more than 3 hours to cover the same distance. In addition, Porto is connected to the Spanish city of Vigo with the Celta train, running twice every day, a 2h 20 min trip.

Light rail

Currently, the major network is the Porto Metro, a light rail system. Consequently, the Infante bridge was built for urban traffic, replacing the Dom Luís I, which was dedicated to the light rail on the second and higher of the bridge's two levels. Six lines are open: lines A (blue), B (red), C (green) and E (purple) all begin at Estádio do Dragão (home to FC Porto) and terminate at Senhor de Matosinhos, Póvoa de Varzim (via Vila do Conde), ISMAI (via Maia) and Francisco Sá Carneiro airport respectively. Line D (yellow) currently runs from Hospital S. João in the north to Santo Ovídio on the southern side of the Douro river. Line F (orange), from Senhora da Hora (Matosinhos) to Fânzeres (Gondomar). The lines intersect at the central Trindade station. Currently, the whole network spans  using 68 stations, thus being the biggest urban rail transit system in the country.

Buses

The city has an extensive bus network run by the STCP (Sociedade dos Transportes Colectivos do Porto, or Oporto Public transport Society) which also operates lines in the neighbouring cities of Gaia, Maia, Matosinhos, Gondomar and Valongo. Other smaller companies connect such towns as Paços de Ferreira and Santo Tirso to the town center. In the past, the city also had trolleybuses. A bus journey is 2.00 €, which must be paid in cash.

Trams

A tram (streetcar) network, of which only three lines remain one of them being a tourist line on the shores of the Douro, saw its construction begin on 12 September 1895, therefore being the first in the Iberian Peninsula. The lines in operation all use vintage tramcars, so the service has become a heritage tramway. STCP also operates these routes as well as a tram museum. The first line of the area's modern-tram, or light rail system, named Metro do Porto, opened for revenue service in January 2003 (after a brief period of free, introductory service in December 2002).

Porto public transportation statistics
The average amount of time people spend commuting with public transit in Porto, for example to and from work, on a weekday is 47 minutes. About 6.5% of public transit riders ride for more than two hours every day. The average time people wait at a stop or station for public transit is 12 minutes, while 17.4% of riders wait for over 20 minutes on average every day. The average distance people ride in a single trip with public transit is 6 km, while 5% travel for over 12 km in a single direction.

Culture

In 2001, Oporto shared the designation European Culture Capital with Rotterdam. In the scope of these events, the construction of the major concert hall space Casa da Música, designed by the Dutch architect Rem Koolhaas, was initiated and finished in 2005.

The first Portuguese moving pictures were taken in Oporto by Aurélio da Paz dos Reis and shown there on 12 November 1896 in the Teatro do Príncipe Real do Porto, less than a year after the first public presentation by Auguste and Louis Lumière. The country's first movie studios Invicta Filmes was also erected in Oporto in 1917 and was open from 1918 to 1927 in the area of Carvalhido. Manoel de Oliveira, a Portuguese film director and the oldest director in the world to be active until his death in 2015, was from Porto. Fantasporto is an international film festival organized in Oporto every year. The DCEU film The Suicide Squad (2021) written and directed by James Gunn based on a Suicide Squad story, shows the city twice in the movie, in which shows us Daniela Melchior a Portuguese actress, who portrays Ratcatcher 2 in which the character is the heart of the film, a Portuguese version of Ratcatcher.

Many renowned Portuguese music artists and cult bands such as GNR, Rui Veloso, Sérgio Godinho, Clã, Pluto, Azeitonas and Ornatos Violeta are from the city or its metropolitan area.
Porto has several museums, concert halls, theaters, cinemas, art galleries, libraries and bookshops. The best-known museums of Oporto are the National Museum Soares dos Reis (Museu Nacional de Soares dos Reis), which is dedicated especially to the Portuguese artistic movements from the 16th to the 20th century, and the Museum of Contemporary Art of the Serralves Foundation (Museu de Arte Contemporânea).

The city has concert halls such as the Coliseu do Oporto by the Portuguese architect Cassiano Branco, an example of the Portuguese decorative arts. Other notable venues include the historical São João National Theatre, the Rivoli theatre, the Batalha cinema and Casa da Música, inaugurated in 2005. The city has the Lello Bookshop, which is frequently rated among the top bookstores in the world.

Porto houses the largest synagogue in the Iberian Peninsula and one of the largest in Europe – Kadoorie Synagogue, inaugurated in 1938.

Entertainment

Porto's most popular event is St. John (São João Festival) on the night of 23–24 June. In this season it's a tradition to have a vase with bush basil decorated with a small poem. During the dinner of the great day, people usually eat sardines and boiled potatoes together with red wine.

Another major event is Queima das Fitas, which starts on the first Sunday of May and ends on the second Sunday of the month. Basically, before the beginning of the study period preceding the school year's last exams, academia tries to have as much fun as possible. The week has 12 major events, starting with the Monumental Serenata on Sunday, and reaching its peak with the Cortejo Académico on Tuesday, when about 50,000 students of the city's higher education institutions march through the downtown streets till they reach the city hall. During every night of the week, a series of concerts takes place on the Queimódromo, next to the city's park, where it is also a tradition for the students in their second-to-last year to erect small tents where alcohol is sold to finance the trip that takes place during the last year of their course of study; an average of 50,000 students attend these events.

Arts

Porto was the birthplace in 1856 of Susanna Roope Dockery, an Anglo-Portuguese watercolour painter who produced many paintings of the city and the people and landscape of the surrounding rural areas. An Englishman, Frederick William Flower, moved to Oporto in 1834 at the age of 19 to work in the wine trade and subsequently became a pioneer of photography in Portugal. Like Dockery, he drew his inspiration from the city, the Douro river and the rural areas.

In 2005, the municipality funded a public sculpture to be built in the Waterfront Plaza of Matosinhos. The resulting sculpture is entitled She Changes by American artist, Janet Echelman, and spans the height of 50 × 150 × 150 metres.

Architecture

Due to its long history, the city of Oporto carries immense architectural patrimony. From the Romanesque Cathedral to the Social Housing projects developed through the late 20th century, much could be said surrounding architecture.

Porto is home to the Oporto School of Architecture, one of the most prestigious architecture schools in Europe and the world. It is also home to two earners of the Pritzker Architecture Prize (two former students of the aforementioned school): Álvaro Siza Vieira and Eduardo Souto de Moura.

This historic area includes the cathedral with its Romanesque choir, the neoclassical Stock Exchange and the Manueline-style Church of Santa Clara. The entire historic centre has been a National Monument since 2001 under Law No. 107/2001. The "Historic Centre of Porto, Luiz I Bridge and Monastery of Serra do Pilar" is a Unesco World Heritage site.

Gastronomy

Porto is home to a number of dishes from traditional Portuguese cuisine. A typical dish from this city is Tripas à Moda do Oporto (Tripe Oporto style). Bacalhau à Gomes de Sá (cod in the style of Gomes de Sá) is another typical codfish dish born in Oporto and popular in Portugal.

The Francesinha is the most popular native snack food in Porto. It is a kind of sandwich with several types of meat covered with cheese and a special sauce made with beer and other ingredients.

Rojões (fried pork meat) and sarrabulho (pig blood-based dish) are also typical dishes of Norte Region which are very popular in the regional capital, the city of Porto. Like in almost all coastal areas of the Portuguese littoral with wide availability of fresh fish, sardinha assada (grilled sardine) is also a usual, classic main dish.

Port wine, an internationally renowned wine, is widely accepted as the city's dessert wine, especially as the wine is made along the Douro River, which runs through the city.

Education
The city has a large number of public and private elementary and secondary schools, as well as kindergartens and nurseries. The oldest and largest international school located in Oporto is the Oporto British School, established in 1894. There are more international schools in the city, such as the French School, the Deutsche Schule zu Porto, and the Oporto International School, which were created in the 20th century.

Higher education 

Porto has several institutions of higher education, the largest one being the state-managed University of Porto (Universidade do Porto), which is the second largest Portuguese university, after the University of Lisbon, with approximately 28,000 students and considered one of the 100 best Universities in Europe. There is also a state-managed polytechnic institute, the Instituto Politécnico do Oporto (a group of technical colleges), and private institutions like the Lusíada University of Porto, Universidade Fernando Pessoa (UFP), the Porto's Higher Education School of Arts (ESAP- Escola Superior Artística do Porto) and a Vatican state university, the Portuguese Catholic University in Oporto (Universidade Católica Portuguesa – Porto) and the Portucalense University in Oporto (Universidade Portucalense – Infante D. Henrique). Due to the recognition, potential for employment and higher revenue, there are many students from the entire country, particularly from the north of Portugal, attending a college or university in Porto.

For foreigners wishing to study Portuguese in the city there are a number of options. As the most popular city in Portugal for ERASMUS students, most universities have facilities to assist foreigners in learning the language. There are also several private language learning institutions in the city.

Sport

Porto, in addition to football stadia since football is by far the most popular sport in Oporto and across the entire country, is home to many athletic sports arenas, most notably the city-owned Super Bock Arena (formerly Pavilhão Rosa Mota), swimming pools in the area of Constituição (between the Marquês and Boavista), and other minor arenas, such as the Pavilhão do Académico, as well as to other sports fields. These sports arenas, swimming pools and sports fields are used for the practice of sports, including varsity and competitive professional sports, in a diversity of sport disciplines ranging from handball, basketball, futsal and field hockey to rink hockey, volleyball, water polo and rugby.

Porto is home to northern Portugal's only Cricket club, the Oporto Cricket and Lawn Tennis Club. Annually, for more than 100 years, a match (the Kendall Cup) has been played between the Oporto Club and the Casuals Club of Lisbon, in addition to regular games against touring teams (mainly from England). The club's pitch is located off the Rua Campo Alegre.

In 1958 and 1960, Porto's streets hosted the Formula One Portuguese Grand Prix on the Boavista street circuit, which are reenacted annually, in addition to a World Touring Car Championship race.

Every year in October the Oporto Marathon is held through the streets of the old city of Porto.

Football

As in most Portuguese cities, football is the most popular sport. There are two main teams in Porto: FC Oporto in the parish of Campanhã, in the eastern part of the city and Boavista in the area of Boavista in the parish of Ramalde, in the western part of the city, close to the city centre. FC Oporto is one of the "Big Three" teams in the main Portuguese football league, and was European champion in 1987 and 2004, won the UEFA Cup (2003) and Europa League (2011) and the Intercontinental Toyota Cup in 1987 and 2004. Boavista have won the championship once, in the 2000–01 season and reached the semi-finals of the UEFA Cup in 2003, where they lost 2–1 to Celtic.

Formerly, Salgueiros from Paranhos was a regular first division club during the 1980s and 1990s but, due to financial indebtedness, the club folded in the 2000s. The club was refounded in 2008 and began playing at the regional level. They now play at the third level of Portugal's national football pyramid.

The biggest stadiums in the city are FC Porto's Estádio do Dragão and Boavista's Estádio do Bessa. The first team in Oporto to own a stadium was Académico, who played in the Estádio do Lima, Académico was one of the eight teams to dispute the first division. Salgueiros, sold the grounds of Estádio Engenheiro Vidal Pinheiro field to the Oporto Metro and planned on building a new field in the Arca d'Água area of Porto. Located a few hundred metres away from the old grounds, it became impossible to build on this plot of land due to a large underground water pocket, and, consequently, they moved to the Estádio do Mar (owned by Leixões S.C.) in the neighboring Matosinhos municipality. For the Euro 2004 football competition, held in Portugal, the Estádio do Dragão was built (replacing the old Estádio das Antas) and the Estádio do Bessa was renovated.

Basketball
The FC Porto's basketball team plays its home games at the Dragão Caixa. Its squad won the second most championships in the history of Portugal's 1st Division. Traditionally, the club provides the Portuguese national basketball team with numerous key players.

Twin towns – sister cities

Porto is twinned with:

 Liège, Belgium (1977)
 Ndola, Zambia (1978)
 Nagasaki, Japan (1978)
 Recife, Brazil (1981)
 Jena, Germany (1984)
 Bristol, England, UK (1984)
 Vigo, Spain (1986)
 Beira, Mozambique (1989)
 Bordeaux, France (1990)
 Duruelo de la Sierra, Spain (1989)
 São Vicente, Cape Verde (1993)
 Lembá, São Tomé and Príncipe (1994)
 Shanghai, China (1995)
 Macau, China (1997)
 Luanda, Angola (1999)
 León, Spain (2001)
 Santos, Brazil (2015)
 Guatemala city, Guatemala (2015)
 Shenzhen, China (2016)
 Marsala, Italy (2016)
 Timișoara, Romania (2018)

Notable people

Explorers and public service 

Prince Henry the Navigator (1394–1460), responsible for the early development of European exploration and maritime trade with other continents.
Afonso Gonçalves Baldaia (1415–1481), nautical explorer
Pêro Vaz de Caminha (1450–1500), wrote the letter Carta do Achamento do Brasil, announcing the discovery of Brazil
Ferdinand Magellan (c. 1480–1521), the globe circumnavigation navigator; lived and studied in Porto
Estêvão Gomes (c. 1483–1538), cartographer and explorer
Duarte Coelho (c. 1485–1554), nobleman, military leader, colonial administrator and founder of Olinda in Brazil
Brás Cubas (1507–1589), explorer, colonial administrator and founder of Santos in Brazil
Inácio de Azevedo (1526–1570), Jesuit missionary
Sir John Croft, 1st Baronet (1778–1862), English diplomat and spy for Wellington against Napoleon
António Pinto Soares (1780–1865), Head of State of Costa Rica in 1842
Sir William Warre (1784–1853), English officer of the British Army
Charles Albert of Sardinia (1798–1849), Italian monarch; died here
António da Silva Porto (1817–1890), trader and explorer in Angola
Venceslau de Lima (1858–1919), geologist, paleontologist, viticulturist and politician, the Prime Minister of Portugal in 1909
Mary of the Divine Heart (1863–1899), countess Droste zu Vischering and Mother Superior of the Good Shepherd Sisters Convent; died here
António Ferreira Gomes (1906–1989), Roman Catholic bishop of Porto
Kaúlza de Arriaga (1915–2004), Army general, writer, professor and politician
Maria de Lourdes Belchior Pontes (1923–1998) a writer, poet, professor and diplomat
Francisco de Sá Carneiro (1934–1980) – politician, Prime Minister of Portugal in 1980
Manuel Clemente (born 1948) a cardinal of the Catholic Church, the Metropolitan Patriarch of Lisbon since 2013 and bishop of Porto in 2007–2013
José Pacheco Pereira (born 1949), politician, professor and political analyst
Alexandre Quintanilha (born 1945), scientist and Member of Parliament, lives in Porto
Rui Moreira (born 1956), businessman and politician, Mayor of Porto
Augusto Santos Silva (born 1956), sociologist, academic, politician and Minister of Foreign Affairs
Rui Rio (born 1957), politician, Mayor of Porto 2002–2013
Diogo Vasconcelos (1968–2011), politician and social innovator

Arts and sciences 

Pedro de Escobar (c. 1465 – after 1535), Renaissance composer of polyphony
Daniel de Fonseca (1672 – c. 1740), Jewish court physician
Tomás António Gonzaga (1744 – c. 1810), Brazilian poet
Vieira Portuense (1765–1805), painter and pioneer of Neoclassicism
Almeida Garrett (1799–1854), writer, theatre director and liberalist
Júlio Dinis (1839–1871), doctor and poet, playwright and novelist
Arthur Napoleão dos Santos (1843–1925), composer and pianist
Annibal Napoleão (1845–1880), composer and pianist
Alfredo Napoleão (1852–1917), composer and pianist
Artur Loureiro (1853–1932), painter, lived and worked in Porto
António Nobre (1867–1900), poet, published Só in 1892, a collection of poems
Abigail de Paiva Cruz (1883–1944), naturalist painter, sculptor and feminist activist
Guilhermina Suggia (1885–1950), cellist, lived and worked in the UK for many years
Armando de Basto (1889–1923), painter, illustrator, sculptor and decorator
Aurora Teixeira de Castro (1891–1931), feminist, notary and playwright
Manoel de Oliveira (1908–2015), film director and screenwriter
Sophia de Mello Breyner Andresen (1919–2004), poet and writer
Ana Hatherly (1929–2015), poet, visual artist, essayist, film maker, painter and writer
Álvaro Siza Vieira (born 1933), architect and architectural educator
Maria Antónia Siza (1940–1973), artist
Alexandre Quintanilha (born 1945), scientist, academic and politician
Sérgio Godinho (born 1945), singer-songwriter, composer, actor, poet and author
Armando Pombeiro (born 1949), chemical engineer
Miguel Sousa Tavares (born 1952), lawyer, journalist and writer
Eduardo Souto de Moura (born 1952), architect and academic
Rui Reininho (born 1955), singer, lead vocalist of rock band GNR
Jorge Chaminé (born 1956), operatic baritone
Richard Zimler (born 1956), novelist, lives and works in Porto
Pedro Abrunhosa (born 1960), singer, songwriter, musician and composer
J. K. Rowling (born 1965), writer who taught English as a foreign language in Porto and lived there in 1991–1993
Armindo Freitas-Magalhães (born 1966), psychologist and scientist
Mónica de Miranda (born 1976), visual artist, photographer, filmmaker, and researcher
Abel Pereira (born 1978), classical horn player
Luciana Abreu (born 1985), singer, actress and television host
Sara Sampaio (born 1991), supermodel
Cláudia Pascoal (born 1994), musician

Business
Charles Augustus Howell (1840–1890), art dealer and alleged Blackmailer
Fernando Van Zeller Guedes (1903–1987), co-founded Sogrape, the inspiration behind Mateus rosé
Belmiro de Azevedo (1938–2017), entrepreneur, industrialist, founder of Sonae
Paulo de Azevedo (born 1965), businessman, son and successor of Belmiro de Azevedo
José Neves (born 1974), billionaire entrepreneur and the founder of Farfetch

Sport 

Jorge Nuno Pinto da Costa (born 1937), president of FC Porto
Humberto Coelho (born 1950), footballer
Fernando Gomes (born 1956), footballer
Rosa Mota (born 1958), marathon runner, Olympic winner
Nuno Marques (born 1970), tennis player
Jorge Costa (born 1971), football player and manager
João Pinto (born 1971), footballer
Miguel Ramos (born 1971), racing driver
Ricardo Sá Pinto (born 1972), football player and manager
Tiago Monteiro (born 1976), racing driver
Petit (born 1976), football player and manager
André Villas-Boas (born 1977), football manager
Bruno Alves (born 1981), footballer
Raul Meireles (born 1983), footballer
Diogo Leite (born 1989), footballer
João Mário (born 1993), footballer
Diogo Jota (born 1996), footballer

Notes

References

Bibliography
 
 Francis, A.D. John Methuen and the Anglo-Portuguese Treaties of 1703. The Historical Journal Vol. 3, No. 2
 Glover, Michael, The Peninsular War 1807–1814 Penguin, 1974.
 
 Loyrette, Henri. Gustave Eiffel. New York: Rizzoli, 1985 
 
 Redacção Quidnovi, com coordenação de José Hermano Saraiva, História de Portugal, Dicionário de Personalidades, Volume VIII, Ed. QN-Edição e Conteúdos, S.A., 2004
 Smith, Digby, The Napoleonic Wars Data Book Greenhill, 1998.

External links

Coordination and Development Committee of the North Region
Metropolitan Area of Porto
Tourism of Oporto and Norte Region, Portugal

 

Cities in Portugal
Populated coastal places in Portugal
Municipalities of Porto District
 
 
World Heritage Sites in Portugal
Port cities and towns in Portugal
Populated places in Porto District
Populated places established in the 3rd century BC